KNLM is an FM radio station broadcasting a Christian radio format from Yucca Valley, California.

History
KNLM began broadcasting on February 13, 2014.

References

External links
 

NLM (FM)
Yucca Valley, California
Radio stations established in 2014
2014 establishments in California